Demo_01 is the fourth extended play from South Korean boy band Pentagon. It was released on September 6, 2017, by Cube Entertainment. The album consists of five tracks, including the title track, "Like This".

Release and promotion
Demo_01 was first announced on August 25, 2017 with a release date of September 6. Beginning on August 29, various teasers were unveiled in order to promote the mini-album. A set of teaser photos of each member, as well as a group shot, were published.

Commercial performance
On the chart dated September 3–9, 2017, Demo_01 debuted at number eight on South Korea's national Gaon Album Chart. By the end of the month, the record shifted 13,759 units domestically.

Track listing

Charts

Release history

References

Cube Entertainment EPs
Kakao M EPs
2017 EPs
Pentagon (South Korean band) EPs
Albums produced by Hui (singer)
Albums produced by Wooseok
Albums produced by Kino (singer)
Albums produced by Yuto
Korean-language EPs